Madanapalle Institute of Technology & Science, also known as MITS, is an Indian engineering college. It was established in 1998 in Madanapalle, India. MITS is an affiliate of JNTUA and is approved by AICTE, New Delhi. MITS is a destination for engineering, management, and computer application studies in India.

History
Madanapalle Institute of Technology and Science was established in 1998 in Madanapalle, Chittoor district of Andhra Pradesh, India.

MITS originated under the auspices of Ratakonda Ranga Reddy Educational Academy and is now under the supervision of Dr. N. Vijaya Bhaskar Choudary, PhD

Accomplishments 
 59 Funded research projects worth of Rs. 550.06 Lakhs 
 The “GOLD” rated by AICTE - CII Survey of Industry - Linked Technical Institutes – 2017
 Graded as ‘AAA’ by Careers 360 for the year 2016
 World Bank (TEQIP-II) funded Institute
 MoU with IIT Hyderabad for Academic Collaboration
 State of the art Learning Management System through Moodle and MOOCs
 100% of the faculty has a Ph.D. qualification and the faculty student ratio is 1:12
 Foreign Language Training by experts in Japanese, German, French and Spanish
 Siemens “Technical Skill Development Institution” sanctioned by Govt. of AP

Courses

Undergraduate

Engineering 

 B.Tech - Civil Engineering
 B.Tech - Computer Science & Engineering
 B.Tech - Computer Science & Engineering (Artificial Intelligence)
 B.Tech - Computer Science & Engineering (Cyber Security)
 B.Tech - Computer Science & Engineering (Data Science)
 B.Tech - Computer Science & Technology
 B.Tech - Electronics & Communication Engineering
 B.Tech - Electrical & Electronics Engineering
 B.Tech - Mechanical Engineering

Post-graduate

Engineering
M.Tech. - Advanced Manufacturing Systems

M.Tech. - Computer Science & Engineering

M.Tech. - Digital Electronics & Communication Systems

M.Tech. - Electrical Power Systems

M.Tech. - Structural Engineering

Management studies
Master of Business Administration (Specialization-HR, Finance, Marketing, Systems) [Eligibility: 10+2+3/4]

Computer applications
Master of Computer Applications[Eligibility: 10+2+3]

Doctoral programs

Engineering
Computer Science & Engineering
Electronics & Communication Engineering
Mechanical Engineering
Electrical & Electronics Engineering

Basic sciences and humanities 
Chemistry
English
Mathematics
Physics

Management
Management Sciences

MoU 
Madanapalle Institute of Technology & Science has MoUs with the following Institutions in different countries. :
• BRNO University of Technology - Czech Republic
• Innopolis University - Russia

• Maharishi Vedic University - Holland

Taiwan Universities

• Providence University
• Ming Chuan University
• Ming Chi University
• Asia University
• National United University
• National Pingtung University of Science & Technology
• National Yunlin University of Science & Technology
• I-Shou University

South Korea Universities

• Kookmin University
• Chungnam National University - Korea

Germany Universities

• European Education and Research Council (GEMS) / Indo-Euro Synchronization
• Steinbeis Institute for Sustainable Resource Usage & Energy Management Tuebingen, Germany.

Fruitful discussions are going on with the following Universities in Japan for B.Tech. Internship & M S Programme.
Japan Universities

• Osaka Institute of Technology
• Nagoya Institute of Technology
• Iwate University
• Kansai University
• Kwansei Gakuin University

Associations
Indian Society for Technical Education (ISTE)
Institute of Electrical and Electronics Engineers, Inc., (IEEE)
Industry-Institute Interaction Cell (IIIC)
Entrepreneurship Development Cell (ED)
Computer Society of India (CSI)
National Service Scheme (NSS)
National Cadet Corps (NCC) 
The Confederation of Indian Industry (CII)
IUCEE – Indo Universal Collaboration for Engineering Education

Affiliations 
 Recognized by AICTE, New Delhi 
 Permanent Affiliated from JNTUA, Anantapuramu
 Approved by UGC under section 2(f) & 12(B)
 NBA Accreditation to UG (ECE, EEE, CSE, MECH, Civil) & PG (MBA & MCA) Programmes
 Accredited by NAAC 
 An ISO 9001 : 2015 Certified institution 
 DSIR/DST Recognition for Scientific & Industrial Research
 Govt. of Andhra Pradesh conferred ‘A’ Grade status
 Recognized Research Center for Engineering, Management & Basic Sciences and Humanities under JNTUA, Anantapuramu
 NSS & NCC Programs

References 

Engineering colleges in Andhra Pradesh
Educational institutions established in 1998
1998 establishments in Andhra Pradesh